Raritan may refer to:

Places
Raritan, Illinois, a village
Raritan, New Jersey, a borough in Somerset County
Raritan Bay, a bay between the U.S. states of New York and New Jersey
Raritan High School, the public high school in Hazlet, New Jersey
Raritan River, a tributary of Raritan Bay in New Jersey
Raritan Township (disambiguation)

People 
Raritan people, a group of Lenape Indians

Other
Raritan (journal), a journal of Rutgers University
Raritan Formation, a Mesozoic geologic formation
Raritan Inc., a provider of KVM Switches and IT infrastructure management solutions, in Somerset, New Jersey
USS Raritan (multiple ships)

See also